Road 96 is a 2021 adventure role-playing video game developed and published by French studio DigixArt as part of HP's OMEN Presents, with additional publishing support by Plug In Digital. The game is set in mid-to-late 1996, within the fictional nation of Petria, an authoritarian country ruled by a harsh dictatorship, undergoing a potentially transformative election season. The player controls several teenagers as they attempt to flee the country through Petria's northern border via Road 96.

Road 96 was released on August 16, 2021 for Microsoft Windows and the Nintendo Switch, and then for the PlayStation 4, PlayStation 5, Xbox One, and Xbox Series X/S on April 14, 2022. The game received generally positive reviews upon release.

A prequel, titled Road 96: Mile 0, is scheduled for an April 2023 release.

Gameplay 
Road 96 is an adventure video game played from the first-person perspective. The game's campaign has the player assume the role of several teenage hitchhikers attempting to flee the authoritarian nation of Petria without being arrested or killed. Each time the player's character succeeds or fails at crossing the border, they assume control of a new teenager attempting to cross the border. Each crossing attempt advances the overarching story arc of the campaign, culminating in a finale set on September 9, Petria's election day. Decisions made by the player during previous attempts are reflected and referenced during each new attempt.

The player travels to Petria's northern border by hitchhiking, walking, taking buses, hailing taxis, or stealing cars. At various procedurally generated stops along their route, they can explore, salvage for supplies, and interact with various characters. The player manages an energy meter which is depleted by performing certain major actions, and can be restored by eating food or sleeping at designated spots. Depleting the meter entirely will cause the player's character to pass out and be arrested. The player can purchase services and goods with money they find, earn, salvage, or steal as well.

During each crossing attempt, the player encounters seven key non-player characters. Interactions with these characters can take the form of conversations and minigames that yield special items which unlock bonuses and interaction opportunities carried over from one crossing attempt into the next. Every interaction with these key characters reveals more backstory about the setting and the characters themselves, while advancing the game's story arc. The player is allowed to make choices which influence the main story arc regarding the current election and the lives of the characters they encounter.

Development and release 
The game was developed by French studio DigixArt, a small development team with about 15 employees. The game was directed by Yoan Fanise, the creator behind Valiant Hearts: The Great War. According to the developer, the story of the game was inspired by the works of Quentin Tarantino, the Coen Brothers, and Bong Joon-ho. It was inspired by different works of fiction, from The Goonies and Porco Rosso. A test given to the player allowing them to flee to work offshore was based on real-world North Korean exams. The game featured procedural generation extensively. According to the team, the game had "148,268 story permutations".

Road 96 was announced at The Game Awards 2020. The game was released for the Nintendo Switch and Microsoft Windows on 16 August 2021. An advertisement for the game was removed by Facebook, due to it being politically motivated. It was released for the Xbox One and the Xbox Series X/S on 14 April 2022. It was also released for the PlayStation 4 and PlayStation 5 on the same day.

Reception 

Road 96 received "generally favourable" reviews according to review aggregator website Metacritic. Alice Bell writing for Rock Paper Shotgun commented that it was a "great journey to go on", but didn't think the game was a particularly good representation of crossing the border, or being homeless.

Marco Procida for Eurogamer.it commented that the game was niche, but had a very good soundtrack. IGNs Tristan Ogilvie enjoyed the experience, but found a few graphical and interface shortcomings. Stefano Scutti from Nerdando.com stated that Road 96 is "an experience to live", gaining a "Gold medal" for the game's "narrative experiment".

References

External links 
 

2021 video games
Action-adventure games
DigixArt games
Fiction about hitchhiking
Nintendo Switch games
Plug In Digital games
Single-player video games
Video games developed in France
Video games set in 1996
Video games set in a fictional country
Video games using procedural generation
Windows games